UFC on ESPN: Covington vs. Lawler (also known as UFC on ESPN 5) was a mixed martial arts event produced by the Ultimate Fighting Championship that took place on August 3, 2019, at the Prudential Center in Newark, New Jersey.

Background
The event was initially linked to Sochi, Russia, which would have marked the promotion's first visit to the Black Sea region of Russia. However, the plans for a Sochi debut fizzled. Subsequently, after also briefly considering contesting the event in Manchester, as well as Tampa, Florida, the promotion announced plans to return to familiar surroundings of Northern New Jersey. The event marked the promotion's eighth visit to the Prudential Center and first since UFC on Fox: Johnson vs. Bader in January 2016.

A welterweight bout between former interim UFC Welterweight Champion Colby Covington and former undisputed champion Robbie Lawler served as the event headliner.

A welterweight bout between Cláudio Silva and Ramazan Emeev was rescheduled for the event. The matchup was originally scheduled to take place in September 2018 at UFC Fight Night: Hunt vs. Oleinik. However, Silva pulled out of the fight citing a lower back injury and was replaced by promotional newcomer Stefan Sekulić. In turn, Emeev was removed from this event due to alleged visa issues, that restricted his travel to the United States. He was replaced by promotional newcomer Cole Williams. At the weigh-ins, Williams weighed in at 176 pounds, 5 pounds over the welterweight non-title fight limit of 171. As a result, he was fined 30 percent of his purse and the bout proceeded at a catchweight.

A women's flyweight bout between former Invicta FC Bantamweight Champion Lauren Murphy and Mara Romero Borella was initially scheduled to take place at UFC 240. However, on June 20 promotion officials elected to reschedule the pairing to take place at this event.

A light heavyweight bout between Ilir Latifi and former UFC Light Heavyweight Championship challenger Volkan Oezdemir was originally scheduled to take place at UFC Fight Night: Gustafsson vs. Smith. However, Latifi was forced to pull out of the event due to a back injury and the bout was cancelled. The pair was initially rescheduled at this event. In turn, the bout was shifted a week later to UFC Fight Night: Shevchenko vs. Carmouche 2 after Oezdemir was faced with alleged visa issues which affected his travel schedule.

A welterweight bout between Zelim Imadaev and Salim Touahri was briefly targeted for this event. However, on July 9 it was announced that Touahri would face Mickey Gall instead. No reason was given for the change.

At the weigh-ins, Dong Hyun Ma weighed in at 158 pounds, 2 pounds over the lightweight non-title fight limit of 156. He was fined 20% of his purse and his bout with Scott Holtzman proceeded at a catchweight.

Results

Bonus awards
The following fighters received $50,000 bonuses.
Fight of the Night: Antonina Shevchenko vs. Lucie Pudilová
Performance of the Night: Nasrat Haqparast and Matt Schnell

See also 

 List of UFC events
 2019 in UFC
 List of current UFC fighters

References 

UFC on ESPN
2019 in mixed martial arts
Mixed martial arts in New Jersey
Sports competitions in Newark, New Jersey